The 2007 FINA Women's Water Polo World League was the fourth edition of the event, organised by the world's governing body in aquatics, the FINA. Three qualification tournaments were held, before the final round took off in the Parc Jean Drapeau Aquatic Centre in Montreal, Quebec, Canada, from July 4 to July 8, 2007.

Preliminary round

Americas
Held from June 1 to June 3, 2007, in Los Alamitos, United States

June 1, 2007

June 2, 2007

June 3, 2007

Asia and Oceania
Held from May 29 to June 3, 2007, in Tianjin, PR China

May 29, 2007

May 30, 2007

May 31, 2007

June 1, 2007

June 2, 2007

June 3, 2007

Europe
Held from June 13 to June 17, 2007, in Kirishi, Russia

June 13, 2007

June 14, 2007

June 15, 2007

June 16, 2007

June 17, 2007

Final round
Wednesday July 4, 2007

Thursday July 5, 2007

Friday July 6, 2007

Saturday July 7, 2007

Standings

Play-offs
Sunday July 8, 2007

Final ranking

Individual awards
Most Valuable Player

Best Goalkeeper

Statistics
Total goals: 600 
Total matches: 30 
Goals per match: 20 
Total of scorers: 119

References

 FINA

FINA Women's Water Polo World League
W
International water polo competitions hosted by Canada